Stephen Dodd (March 7, 1770 – March 22, 1855) was an American politician who served as the Mayor of Newark from 1844 to 1845.

References

1770 births
1855 deaths
Mayors of Newark, New Jersey
New Jersey Whigs
19th-century American politicians
People from Mendham Township, New Jersey